Samariddin Sagdiyev (10 January 1918 in Samarqand, Uzbek SSR, Soviet Union - 29 May 1983 in Dushanbe, Tajik SSR) was a Tajik actor of Uzbek origin.

Life
After education at the Samarqand Drama College (1935) and the Tashkent College of Music (1936), he began to work as a theater actor. In 1936 he was sent to the Tajik SSR. From 1956 he worked there at the well-known film studio Tajikfilm. In 1962 he was awarded the title of "People's Artist of the Tajik SSR".

Family
His son Shuhrat Sagdiyev is a historian and university lecturer at the Russian-Tajik Slavonic University.

Films
He participated as an actor in following films:
  (1957)
  (1959)
  (1972)
  (1976)
  (1980)
  (1982)

References

External links
 
 Biography in Russian

Tajikistani actors 	
1918 births	
1983 deaths
Uzbekistani actors